The 1926 Copa del Rey Final was the 26th final of the Spanish cup competition, the Copa del Rey. The final was played at the Mestalla in Valencia on 16 May 1926. Barcelona were huge favourites because they had great international figures such as Josep Samitier, the Filipino Paulino Alcántara and the Argentine Emili Sagi-Barba, and they proved the favouritism by prevailing over Atlético Madrid 3–2 after extra time to win their seventh title.

Match details 

|valign="top" width="50%"|

|}

References

1926
Copa
FC Barcelona matches
Atlético Madrid matches